Vastum is an American death metal band, formed in 2009 in San Francisco, California. The current line-up of the band consists of bassist Luca Indrio, guitarist and vocalist Leila Abdul-Rauf, vocalist Daniel Butler, drummer Adam Perry, and guitarist Shelby Lermo.

The band is noted for its lyrics, which deal with themes such as sexuality and eroticism, and are influenced by French writer Georges Bataille and psychoanalyst Jean Laplanche. Musically, the band's releases feature a death metal sound based on "slow to mid-tempo, grinding grooves, interspersed with up-tempo shifts, and a bellowing, enunciated growl."

The band's third studio album, Hole Below, was listed as number 19 on Pitchfork's list of "The Best Metal Albums of 2015."

Members
Current
 Luca Indrio — bass guitar (2009—present)
 Leila Abdul-Rauf — guitar, vocals (2009—present)
 Daniel Butler — vocals (2009—present)
 Shelby Lermo — guitar (2013—present)
 Chad Gailey — drums (2013—2015, 2018—present)

Past
 R.D. Davies — drums (2009—2011)
 Kyle House — guitar (2009—2013)
 Adam Perry — drums (2011—2013, 2015—2018)

Timeline

Discography
Studio albums

 Carnal Law (2011)
 Patricidal Lust (2013)
 Hole Below (2015)
 Orificial Purge (2019)

References

External links
 

Musical groups established in 2009
Death metal musical groups from California
Musical groups from San Francisco
2009 establishments in California